This List of navigation authorities in the United Kingdom is a list of links to any navigation authority in the United Kingdom, relating to any navigable waterway, aqueduct, canal, navigation, river or port.

These include:

 narrow canals, broad canals, or ship canals                         
 rivers which have been made navigable                                         
 the Broads                                                     
 the navigable drains of The Fens.

Examples of navigation authorities

The "Big Three"
 Canal and River Trust – charity replacing British Waterways in managing the majority of the canals and many navigable rivers
 Environment Agency – environmental regulatory body, manages its waterways as part of its water management obligations.
 Broads Authority – has status similar to other British national parks but alone amongst them also exercises a navigation function. The "Sandford Principle" as applied in other national parks does not apply here.

Other authorities
 Local authorities
 National park authorities
 Trusts

Navigation authorities in the UK
 Associated British Ports - ABP Humber
 Avon Navigation Trust (Stratford-on-Avon to Tewkesbury)
 Basingstoke Canal Authority
 Beaulieu River
 Bridgewater Canal - Manchester Ship Canal Company in conjunction with the Bridgewater Canal Trust 
 Bristol Harbour Authority
 The Canal & River Trust, formerly British Waterways - supported by grant-in-aid from Government
 Broads Authority - a national park authority
 Cambridgeshire Lodes
 Cardiff Harbour Authority
 Chesterfield Canal Partnership
 City of York Council
 Company of Proprietors of the Chelmer & Blackwater navigation
 Company of Proprietors of the Neath Canal Navigation
 Company of Proprietors of the Stroudwater Navigation
 Conservators of the River Cam
 Dart Harbour and Navigation Authority - a Trust Port, Dartmouth
 Devon County Council
 Driffield Navigation Trust
 Droitwich Canals Trust
 Environment Agency - supported by grant-in-aid from Government
 Essex Waterways Ltd - a subsidiary of the Inland Waterways Association
 Exe Estuary Navigation Authority based at Exeter
 Exeter City Council
 Gloucester Harbour Trustees - a Trust Port
 Herefordshire & Gloucestershire Canal Trust
 Hull City Council
 Inland Waterways Association subsidiary Essex Waterways Ltd
 Ipswich & Stowmarket Navigation - River Gipping Trust
 River Ivel - Environment Agency and riparian landowners
 Lake District National Park Authority
 Lancaster Canal's Northern Reaches - various ownerships
 Lapal Canal  -  various ownerships
 Little Ouse Navigation - Environment Agency / riparian landowners
 Loch Lomond and the Trossachs National Park Authority
 Manchester Ship Canal Company - the majority of shares are owned by Peel Ports, a subsidiary of The Peel Group.
 Medway Ports
 Middle Level Commissioners
 Neath Canal Navigation, Neath Port Talbot County Borough Council
 Port of Hull and the River Hull, Associated British Ports 
 Port of London Authority
 River Dee, Wales  -  Environment Agency has harbour authority responsibilities downstream
 River Glen, Lincolnshire - Environment Agency
 River Great Ouse - Environment Agency
 River Hamble Harbour Office 
 River Idle - Environment Agency
 River Medway - Non-tidal: Environment Agency; Tidal: Medway Ports
 River Severn - Avon and Wiltshire: Bristol Haven Conservancy
 River Severn, Gloucestershire/Herefordshire: Gloucester Harbour Trustees
 River Tyne - Tidal: Port of Tyne Authority; Non-tidal: various
 Scottish waterways  - managed by the Scottish Executive and British Waterways Scotland (BWS)
 Sedgemoor District Council - as Harbour Authority for the Port of Bridgwater and the River Parrett
 Sleaford Navigation
 Ulster Canal - various, both in Northern Ireland and the Republic of Ireland
 Waterways Ireland
 The Waterways Trust
 The Wey & Arun Canal Trust, Wey & Arun Junction Canal
 Wey and Godalming Navigations, National Trust
 Wilts & Berks Canal Trust
 River Witham - Witham Fourth District Drainage Board

See also

Waterways 
 List of waterways
 Waterways in the United Kingdom
 Association of Inland Navigation Authorities (AINA), an unincorporated membership organisation for inland navigation authorities
 Inland Waterways Association
 Scottish Inland Waterways Association
 Inland Waterways Association of Ireland (includes Northern Ireland)
 List of waterway societies in the United Kingdom

Rivers
 Rivers of the United Kingdom
 List of rivers of the United Kingdom
 Estuary, Firth, Floodplain, River delta, Source (river or stream), Tributary

Canals
 Canals of the United Kingdom
 List of canal aqueducts in Great Britain
 List of canal basins in Great Britain
 List of canal junctions in Great Britain
 List of canal locks in Great Britain
 List of canal tunnels in Great Britain

Seaports
 List of seaports

Other
 Navigability
 Tide

References

External links
Association of Inland Navigation Authorities website
Inland Waterways Association List of navigation authorities

Water transport in the United Kingdom
Waterways organisations in the United Kingdom
navigation authorities